A sacrificial victim (from Latin victima) is a living being that is killed and offered as a sacrifice. It may refer to:
 Animal sacrifice, the ritual killing and offering of an animal, usually as part of a religious ritual or to appease or maintain favour with a deity
 Sacrificial lamb, a metaphorical reference to a person or animal sacrificed for the common good
 Human sacrifice, the act of killing one or more humans as part of a ritual, usually intended to please or appease gods, spirits or the dead ancestors, such as a propitiatory offerings or as a retainer sacrifice when a king's servants are killed in order for them to continue to serve their master in the next life 
 Child sacrifice, the ritualistic killing of children in order to please or appease a deity, supernatural beings, or sacred social order, tribal, group or national loyalties in order to achieve a desired result
 Sacrifice in ancient Greek religion
 Sacrificial victims of Minotaur, 14 young noble Athenians (seven young men and seven maidens) chosen to be offered as sacrificial victims to the half-human, half-taurine monster Minotaur to be killed in retribution for the death of Minos' son Androgeos
 Sacrifice in ancient Roman religion
 Hostia, an offering, usually an animal, in a sacrifice
 Victima, an animal offering in a sacrifice, or very rarely a human

See also
 Sacrifice (disambiguation)
 Victim (disambiguation)